Vladimír Popovič (born 27 November 1939, Uhrovec, Vysoká nad Uhom, district Michalovce) is a Slovak painter, visual artist and a professor.

Vladimír Popovič is an important Slovak artist whose work spans over 50 years.

Biography 
Vladimír Popovič was born in eastern Slovakia (Vysoká nad Uhom) in 1939. He grew up at the foothills of the High Tatras mountain range.

After completing the Academy of Fine Arts and Design in Bratislava ( 1959–1965) he presented his first "crumpled paper" works, object assemblages and action art involving paper.

He regularly takes part in international symposiae in painting, enamel and paper.

His works are presented in numerous domestic and international exhibitions, as well as being part of many public and private collections.

He lives and works in Bratislava.

References

External links
 Vladimír Popovič official web site - the original source of this article

Slovak painters
Slovak artists
Living people
1939 births